Sherridon, Manitoba is an unincorporated community in Manitoba, Canada.

History 
Sherridon originated as the service centre for the nearby Sherritt Gordon nickel mines. The mine closed in 1952, resulting in the equipment and many of the workers and families relocating to Lynn Lake. Over the next three years, 208 buildings were moved to Lynn Lake from Sherridon. Houses, stores, banks and churches were loaded on sleighs and pulled by caterpillar tractors over the ice and snow to Lynn Lake.

The historic four-storey Hotel Cambrian, one of the only early 20th century buildings in the community not moved to Lynn Lake, was destroyed by fire on June 2, 2012.  At the time of the fire the hotel was unoccupied, in a state of disrepair, and had been disconnected from electricity.  The Royal Canadian Mounted Police consider the fire suspicious.

A recent gold mine, operated by Pioneer Metals at Puffy Lake, closed in 1989.

Geography 
Pukatawagan Reserve is  further north of Sherridon. A  community-access gravelled road was constructed as part of the Puffy Lake Mine development, and the community is now connected to Provincial Trunk Highway 10 (PTH 10)  between Cranberry Portage and Flin Flon.

Demographics 

References 

Designated places in Manitoba
Northern communities in Manitoba